Beware of Strangers is a 1917 American silent drama film directed by Colin Campbell and starring Fritzi Brunette, Tom Santschi, and Bessie Eyton.

Cast

References

Bibliography
 Donald W. McCaffrey & Christopher P. Jacobs. Guide to the Silent Years of American Cinema. Greenwood Publishing, 1999.

External links
 

1917 films
1917 drama films
1910s English-language films
American silent feature films
Silent American drama films
American black-and-white films
Films directed by Colin Campbell
1910s American films